The Rapid Refresh (RR or RAP) is a numerical weather prediction (NWP) model. The model is designed to provide short-range hourly weather forecasts for North America. The Rapid Refresh was officially made operational on 1 May 2012, replacing the rapid update cycle (RUC). The model also serves as the boundary conditions for the higher-resolution High Resolution Rapid Refresh HRRR model, that uses a  grid spacing on a domain covering the continental United States.

The Rapid Refresh is run at the NOAA National Centers for Environmental Prediction (NCEP). It is based on the framework of the Weather Research and Forecasting model (WRF); the Global Forecast System (GFS) provides the boundary parameters. The grid points are spaced every , with 50 vertical intervals extending up to the 10-hectopascal (10 mb) level of the atmosphere. The model runs once each hour, with forecasts given hourly out to 18 hours.

An experimental version of the Rapid Refresh runs at the Earth System Research Laboratory (ESRL), a NOAA unit that develops models in the research stage prior to operational implementation at NCEP.

References

External links
 Rapid Refresh website
 High Resolution Rapid Refresh website

National Weather Service numerical models